Sean McKittrick (born March 20, 1975) is American film producer. He is best known for his works Donnie Darko, Southland Tales, for which he was nominated for Palme d'Or at 2006 Cannes Film Festival, and Get Out, which earned him many accolades and nominations, including one for the Academy Award for Best Picture at the 90th Academy Awards. He earned another nomination for the award the following year for BlacKkKlansman. His latest film, Us, was released on March 22, 2019.

He is a principal at production companies Darko Entertainment and QC Entertainment.

Filmography
 1997: Visceral Matter (producer)
 2001: Donnie Darko (producer) 
 2006: Southland Tales (producer) 
 2009: I Hope They Serve Beer in Hell (producer) 
 2009: The Box (producer) 
 2009: World's Greatest Dad (producer) 
 2010: Operation: Endgame (producer) 
 2011: God Bless America (producer) 
 2013: Bad Words (producer) 
 2013: Hell Baby (producer) 
 2013: Jimi: All Is by My Side (producer) 
 2015: Home Sweet Hell (producer) 
 2016: Green is Gold (executive producer) 
 2016: Happy Birthday (producer) 
 2016: Pride and Prejudice and Zombies (producer) 
 2017: Band Aid (executive producer) 
 2017: Get Out (producer) 
 2018: A Futile and Stupid Gesture (executive producer) 
 2018: BlacKkKlansman (producer) 
 2018: The Oath (producer)
 2018: Time Freak (executive producer) 
 2019: Us (producer)
 2020: Antebellum (producer)

References

External links
 Sean McKittrick Filmography at Movie Insider 
 

1975 births
Living people
American film producers
American film directors